Olkhovka is a rural locality (a village) in Zabolotskoye Rural Settlement, Permsky District, Perm Krai, Russia. The population was 15 as of 2010.

Geography 
It is located 3.5 km south-east from Gorshki.

References 

Rural localities in Permsky District